Norman Bruce Fletcher (10 September 1915 – 4 March 1992) was an Australian rules footballer who played for the South Melbourne Football Club and Hawthorn Football Club in the Victorian Football League (VFL).

References

External links 

1915 births
1992 deaths
Australian rules footballers from Victoria (Australia)
Sydney Swans players
Hawthorn Football Club players